GURPS Space Adventures is an adventure published by Steve Jackson Games (SJG) in  1991 for the role-playing system GURPS (Generic Universal Role-Playing System), and more specifically, for the science-fiction setting provided by the previously published GURPS Space.

Plot summary
GURPS Space Adventures contains three adventures intended for use with GURPS Space:
 "Rebirth"
 "Beware the Health Police"
 "Raid on Sterling"

Publication history
SJG published GURPS Space in 1988, one of the broad genre books that followed the publication of the GURPS Basic Set (1986). GURPS Space was supported by several second-tier sourcebooks including the GURPS Space Atlases (1988-1991), GURPS Space Bestiary (1990), and GURPS Aliens (1990). 

GURPS Space Adventures used this science-fiction framework for three adventures, written by William A. Barton, Thomas S. Gressman, and David L. Pulver, with artwork by Donna Barr, C. Brent Ferguson, Ruth Thompson, and L. A. Williams, and cover art by Alan Gutierrez. SJG published the 128-page softcover book in 1991.

Reception
In the September 1993 edition of Dragon (Issue #197), Allen Varney thought two of the adventures were "no more than competent, unremarkable science fiction." But he found the third adventure, Beware the Health Police, to be "a dazzling mix of cosmic adventure and comic invention." Varney thought this adventure alone was worth the price of the book, calling it "Great, goofy fun."

References

Space Adventures
Role-playing game supplements introduced in 1991
Science fiction role-playing game adventures